The Proceedings of A. Razmadze Mathematical Institute  is a peer-reviewed scientific journal published by the A. Razmadze Mathematical Institute. The journal is the continuation of Tbilisis Mathematikuri Institutis Shromebi (Trudy Tbilisskogo Matematicheskogo Instituta, Travaux de L'Institut Mathematique de Tbilissi) and was established in 1937. It carries its current name as of volume 100. The journal is named for Georgian mathematician Andrea Razmadze, one of the original four of the Mathematical Institute, and a co-founder of Tbilisi State University.

The journal has a wide scope publishing research papers in all domains of Mathematics, both pure and applied. The articles are indexed and reviewed in Zentralblatt für Mathematik and Mathematical Reviews.

Notable authors include Paul Erdős, Edmund Landau, and Hua Luogeng.

Editor-in-Chief
The current editor in chief is Vakhtang Kokilashvili (A. Razmadze Mathematical Institute).

References 

Mathematics journals
Publications established in 1937
Multilingual journals
Triannual journals